St. Jude Educational Institute was a private, Roman Catholic high school in Montgomery, Alabama, United States.  It was located in the Roman Catholic Archdiocese of Mobile, and was built as part of the City of St. Jude by Father Harold Purcell for the advancement of the Negro people.

St. Jude was opened in 1946.  It offered a full college preparatory program as well as basic skills and trade programs at night for adults.

During the Selma to Montgomery marches in 1965, the march camped on the St. Jude campus.  The  "Stars for Freedom" rally was held, featuring singers Harry Belafonte, Peter, Paul and Mary, and Tony Bennett, and comedian Sammy Davis Jr.  The campus was listed on the National Register of Historic Places in 1990, and is part of the Selma to Montgomery National Historic Trail, created in 1996.

It closed after the end of the school year in May 2014 due to falling enrollment.

Notable alumni
 Ousmane Cisse, basketball player
 JaMychal Green, basketball player
 Winston E. Willis, real estate developer
 Frank Oliver, football player NFL

References

External links
 School website

National Register of Historic Places in Montgomery, Alabama
High schools in Montgomery, Alabama
Defunct Catholic secondary schools in the United States
Educational institutions established in 1946
Educational institutions disestablished in 2014
Historic districts in Montgomery, Alabama
Private middle schools in Alabama
1946 establishments in Alabama
2014 disestablishments in Alabama
African-American Roman Catholic schools